The year 1909 in film involved some significant events.



Events
 Carl Laemmle founds the Independent Moving Pictures Company (IMP).
Selig Polyscope Company establish the first permanent film studio in Los Angeles in Edendale, Los Angeles.
 The New York Motion Picture Company is founded and also open a film studio in Edendale. The studio is later used by Mack Sennett's Keystone Studios and then Mascot Pictures, which become part of Republic Pictures.
 February 4 – The Paris Film Congress begins, an attempt by leading European producers to form a cartel similar to that of the Motion Picture Patents Company in the United States.
May 12 – Mr. Flip is released and is the first film to feature someone being hit in the face with a pie.
May 23 – The first news cinema, The Daily Bioscope, opens in London.
June 17 – In the Sultan's Power is the first film ever completely made in Los Angeles, California. It is filmed by director Francis Boggs.
October 25 – IMP release their first film, Hiawatha, based on the 1855 poem The Song of Hiawatha by Henry Wadsworth Longfellow.
November 5 - A Nature Movie by Arthur C. Pillsbury using film to explore the wonders of Yosemite. This first showing was for John Muir, a friend, and associate of Pillsbury's.  Included was footage of the Hetch Hetchy. This film was then shown for the 1910 season at the Pillsbury Studio in Yosemite, advertised using postcards.
December 2 – Matsunosuke Onoe, who will become the first superstar of Japanese cinema, appears in his first film, Goban Tadanobu.
December 20 – James Joyce opens the Volta Cinematograph, the first cinema in Dublin.

Films released in 1909

J. Stuart Blackton

 Oliver Twist
 The Judgment of Solomon
 The Life of Moses 
 The Life of Napoleon
 A Midsummer Night's Dream, directed by Charles Kent and J. Stuart Blackton
 Les Misérables, directed by J. Stuart Blackton.  A proto-feature film, or many short-films (in this case 4) that when combined can be seen as one feature film.
 Princess Nicotine; or, The Smoke Fairy

D. W. Griffith

 At the Altar
 A Corner in Wheat
 The Country Doctor, starring Mary Pickford
 The Curtain Pole, directed by D.W. Griffith and Mack Sennett (uncredited)
 The Death Disc: A Story of the Cromwellian Period
 The Drive for a Life
 A Drunkard's Reformation
 Edgar Allan Poe: The Raven
 Fools of Fate
 The Golden Louis
 The Hessian Renegades
 Lady Helen's Escapade
 The Lonely Villa
 The Red Man's View
 Resurrection
 The Sealed Room, starring Mary Pickford
 The Suicide Club, directed by D. W. Griffith (U.S.)
 Those Awful Hats
 A Trap for Santa Claus

Georges Méliès
 The Count's Wooing
 The Diabolical Tenant (aka The Diabolical Lodger), directed by George Melies (French)
 The Doctor's Secret, directed by George Melies (French)
 Fortune Favors the Brave, directed by George Melies (French)
 Le papillon fantastique

Others

 The Adventures of Lieutenant Rose
 The Airship Destroyer (originally titled Der Luftkrieg Der Zukunft, also titled "The Aerial Torpedo", "The Battle of the Clouds" {UK} and "The Battle in the Clouds" {US}), directed by Walter R. Booth
 The Ancient Roman (made in Italy)
 Ballad of a Witch, directed by Luigi Maggi (made in Italy)
 The Bewitched Manor House (French/ Pathe)
 Bluebeard, directed by J. Searle Dawley for Thomas Edison, starred Charles Ogle
 The Bogey Woman (French/ Pathe)
 The Butcher's Dream (French)
 Capturing the North Pole, features Baron Munchausen (British/ Urban-Eclipse Films)
 The Cat That Was Changed Into a Woman, directed by Louis Feuillade (French)
 The Convict Guardian's Nightmare (French)
 The Cowboy Millionaire, directed by Francis Boggs and Otis Turner 
 Dance of Fire (Pathe)
 Dante's Inferno, directed by Giuseppe de Liguoro, starring Salvatore Papa (Italian); ran 59 minutes
 The Defeat of Satan (French/ Pathe)
 The Devil (Edison Co.) adaptation of the play starring George Arliss
 Doctor Jekyll and Mr. Hyde, directed by August Blom, starring Alwin Neuss and Oda Alstrup; made in Denmark for Nordisk Films
 Don Juan Tenorio, directed by Enrique Rosas (made in Mexico)
 Doomed (French/ Pathe)
 The Egyptian Mystery (Edison)
Electric Transformations, directed by Percy Stow (British/ Clarendon)
 Entrevista de los Presidentes Díaz-Taft (Mexico), a documentary directed by the Alva Brothers
 Faust, directed by J. Searle Dawley and Edwin S. Porter for Thomas Edison
 The Ferryman's Sweetheart (Gaumont)
 The Fitzsimmons-Bill Lang Fight
 The Forbidden Fruit (Pathe)
 Gertie the Dinosaur, animated cartoon by Winsor McKay
 Goddess of the Sea
 The Grey Lady (aka The Grey Dame), directed by Viggo Larsen, starring Viggo Larsen as Sherlock Holmes (Denmark)
 Hansel and Gretel
 The Haunted Hotel (French/ Pathe)
 The Haunted Man, introduced the "doppelganger" theme, similar to The Student of Prague (Germany/ Duskes Film)
 Her Dolly's Revenge (French/ Lux)
 Hiawatha, directed by William V. Ranous based on the 1855 poem The Song of Hiawatha by Henry Wadsworth Longfellow, the first film produced by Carl Laemmle's Independent Moving Pictures.
 The Hunchback, directed by Van Dyke Brooke for Vitagraph; unauthorized remake of the 1906 film Esmeralda
 The Imp of the Bottle (Thomas Edison), based on the story by Robert Louis Stevenson
 The Invisible Thief, directed by Segundo de Chomon and Ferdinand Zecca (French); first adaptation of the H.G. Wells novel The Invisible Man
 Les Joyeux Microbes, directed by Émile Cohl
 The Last Look (Pathe)
 Lucrece Borgia (French)
 Lunatics in Power (Thomas Edison Co.), based on a story by Edgar Allan Poe called The System of Dr. Tarr and Professor Fether
 Macbeth, directed by André Calmettes
 The Man Monkey (Pathe)
 The Man Who Laughs (French), based on the famous novel by Victor Hugo
 The Marvelous Pearl (made in Italy)
 Mephisto and the Maiden,  directed by Frank Boggs
 The Mirror of Life (French/ Pathe)
 Miss Faust (French/ Pathe)
 Mr. Flip, directed by Gilbert M. 'Broncho Billy' Anderson
 A Modern Dr. Jekyll, produced by William Selig
 The Moonstone, produced by William Selig, based on the novel by Wilkie Collins
 Mother Goose (Edison Co.)
 The Mummy of the King Ramses directed by Gerard Bourgeois (French)
 Mystery of Edwin Drood, directed by Arthur Gilbert (British), based on Charles Dickens' novel
 Mystery of the Lama Convent, directed by Viggo Larsen (Denmark)
 Nerone, directed by Luigi Maggi
 The New Jonah (Pathe)
 The Nymphs' Bath (French/ Gaumont)
 The Old Shoemaker (French/ Gaumont), based on The Tell-Tale Heart by Edgar Allan Poe 
 The Oriental Mystic (Vitagraph, U.S.)
 Papa Gaspard; or, The Ghost of the Rocks
 Phaedra (French/ Pathe) featured a sea monster
 The Phantom Sirens
 The Pit and the Pendulum, directed by Henri Desfontaines (French/ Warwick), based on the famous story by Edgar Allan Poe
 The Princess and the Fisherman, directed by Louis Feuillade (French)
 Revenge of the Ghosts, animated cartoon directed by Emil Cohl (French)
 Satan's Smithy, directed by Segundo de Chomon (French)
 Shooting in the Haunted Woods, directed by Louis Feuillade (French)
 The Spirit of the Lake (fantasy film made in Italy);  it was followed by a sequel called The Legend of the Lake in 1911
 The Suicide Club, directed by Victorin-Hippolyte Jasset (French)
 The Sword and the King (U.S./ Vitagraph)
 Talked to Death (Lubin)
 Teddy Roosevelt in Africa, directed by Cherry Kearton
 Tis Now the Very Witching Time of Night, produced by Thomas Edison
 The Ugliest Queen on Earth (French/ Gaumont)
 Viy (aka The Vij), directed by Vasilii Gonmcharov (Russian)
 The Wild Ass's Skin (French/ Pathe) based on the story by Balzac
 The Witch
 The Witch's Cavern (Selig Polyscope)

Births
 January 1 – Dana Andrews, actor (died 1992)
 January 3 – Victor Borge, musician, actor (died 2000)
 January 8 - Willy Millowitsch, actor (died 1999)
 January 15 – Gene Krupa, musician, actor (died 1973)
 January 22 – Ann Sothern, actress (died 2001)
 January 24 – Ann Todd, actress (died 1993)
 January 29 – Alan Marshal, actor (died 1961)
 February 2 – Frank Albertson, actor (died 1964)
 February 6 – Aino Talvi, Estonian actress (d. 1992) 
 February 9 
Carmen Miranda, singer, actress (died 1955)
Heather Angel, actress (died 1986)
 February 11 
Max Baer – boxer, actor (died 1959)
Joseph L. Mankiewicz – director, screenwriter, producer (died 1993)
 February 16
Hugh Beaumont, actor, director, writer (died 1982)
Jeffrey Lynn, actor (died 1995)
 March 19 – Louis Hayward, actor (died 1995)
 March 26 – Chips Rafferty, actor (died 1971)
 April 4 – Bobby Connelly, child actor (died 1922)
 April 22– Ralph Byrd, actor (died 1952)
 April 29 – Tom Ewell, actor (died 1994)
 May 4 – Howard Da Silva, actor, director (died 1986)
 May 15 – James Mason, actor (died 1984)
 May 16 – Margaret Sullavan, actress (died 1960)
 May 30 – Benny Goodman, musician, actor (died 1986)
 June 7 – Jessica Tandy, actress (died 1994)
 June 8 – Robert Carson, actor (died 1979)
 June 14 – Burl Ives, actor (died 1995)
 June 20 – Errol Flynn,  actor (died 1959)
 June 26- Wolfgang Reitherman, director, producer, animator (died 1985)
 July 1 – Madge Evans, actress (died 1981)
 July 11
Irene Hervey, actress (died 1998)
John 'Dusty' King, actor, singer (died 1987)
 July 12 – Curly Joe DeRita,  actor (died 1993)
 July 23 – Helen Martin, American actress (died 2000)
 July 24 - Sydney Bromley, English character actor (died 1987)
 August 25 
Ruby Keeler, singer, actress (died 1993)
Michael Rennie, actor (died 1971)
 August 26 – Jim Davis, American actor (died 1981)
 September 7 – Elia Kazan, director (died 2003)
 September 27 - Amerigo Tot, Hungarian actor (died 1984)
 October 6 – Robert Carson, screenwriter (died 1983)
October 20 – Carla Laemmle, actress (died 2014)
October 29 – Douglass Montgomery, actor (died 1966)
 November 11 – Robert Ryan, actor (died 1973)
 November 26 – Frances Dee, actress (died 2004)
 December 9 – Douglas Fairbanks Jr., actor (died 2000)
 December 12 – Karen Morley, actress (died 2003)
 December 20 – Diane Ellis, actress (died 1930)
 December 22 - Patricia Hayes, English character actress (died 1998)

Deaths
 January 27 – Benoît-Constant Coquelin, actor, Cyrano de Bergerac (born 1841)
 September 4 – Clyde Fitch, author & playwright whose works have been adapted into films. (born 1865)

Film debuts
 Fatty Arbuckle – Ben's Kid (as Roscoe Arbuckle) 
 Ethel Clayton – Justified (short)
 Dolores Costello (as a child) –  A Midsummer Night's Dream 
 Helene Costello (as a child) – Les Misérables (Part I) (short)
 Marie Dressler – Marie Dressler (short)
 Francis Ford – The Stolen Wireless
 Annette Kellerman – The Bride of Lammermoor:  A Tragedy of Bonnie Scotland
 James Kirkwood – The Heart of an Outlaw (short)
 Florence La Badie – The Politician's Love Story 
 Tom Mix – The Cowboy Millionaire 
 Mary Pickford – Mrs. Jones Entertains
 Billy Quirk – The Heart of an Outlaw
 William A. Russell – Tag Day (short)
 William Stowell – The Cowboy Millionaire
 Blanche Sweet – A Man with Three Wives
 Rose Tapley – The Way of the Cross (short) 
 Clara Kimball Young – Washington Under the American Flag (short)

References

 
Film by year
Articles containing video clips